Billy Connolly Live 1994 is a live comedy video by Billy Connolly from one of 20 nights at the Hammersmith Apollo. It was the best-selling comedy VHS tape in the UK in 1994. Connolly's performances at the Apollo had been well received by critics.

References

1994 films
Stand-up comedy concert films
1994 comedy films
Albums recorded at the Hammersmith Apollo
British comedy films
1990s English-language films
1990s British films